Church of Lukumi Babalu Aye (CLBA) is a Santería church in Hialeah, Florida. The church practices Cuba's  Santería or Lucumí tradition / Regla de Ocha.

CLBA was founded and incorporated in 1974 by Oba Ernesto Pichardo and his associates. In the 1980s, the church decided to begin public services in Hialeah. The city of Hialeah responded by passing four ordinances which outlawed animal sacrifice. The dispute between the church and Hialeah went to the Supreme Court of the United States; the case, Church of the Lukumi Babalu Aye v. City of Hialeah, was resolved in CLBA's favor.

See also
 Babalú-Ayé

References
J. Gordon Melton (1996). Encyclopedia of American Religions (Detroit, Mich.: Gale) p. 797

External links
Church of the Lukumi Babalu Aye v. the City of Hialeah
Official church website

African Americans in Florida
Cuban-American culture in Florida
Santería
Churches in Miami-Dade County, Florida
Hialeah, Florida
1974 establishments in Florida